"Storm" is a song performed by Swedish singer Victor Crone. It was co-written by Stig Rästa, who also wrote the Estonian entries to the Eurovisions of 2015 and 2016. The song represented  at the Eurovision Song Contest 2019 in Tel Aviv. It was performed during the first semi-final on 14 May 2019, and qualified for the final, where it finished in 20th place with 76 points.

Eurovision Song Contest

The song represented Estonia in the Eurovision Song Contest 2019, with Victor Crone being chosen through Eesti Laul 2019, the music competition that selects Estonia's entries for the Eurovision Song Contest. On 28 January 2019, a special allocation draw was held which placed each country into one of the two semi-finals, as well as which half of the show they would perform in. Estonia was placed into the first semi-final, to be held on 14 May 2019, and was scheduled to perform in the second half of the show. Once all the competing songs for the 2019 contest had been released, the running order for the semi-finals was decided by the show's producers rather than through another draw, so that similar songs were not placed next to each other. Estonia performed in position 14 and firmly qualified for the grand final from 4th place with 198 points overall.

At Eurovision, Kaire Vilgats, Dagmar Oja, Kaido Põldma, Lars Gunnar Säfsund and author Stig Rästa joined Crone off-stage as backing singers during the live performance. The actress and singer Saara Kadak, who supported Crone on stage during the Estonian national final, withdrew due to her wedding day and upcoming premiere of the musical West Side Story at the Estonian National Opera.

Track listing

Charts

Certifications

References

2019 songs
Eurovision songs of 2019
Eurovision songs of Estonia
2018 singles